TRX may refer to:

Transportation
 Honda TRX250R, an ATV
 Honda TRX450R, an ATV
 Michelin TRX, a car tire
 Nissan Pintara TRX
 TraXion, a defunct Danish railway company
 Yamaha TRX850, a sports motorcycle
 Ram Rebel TRX, a production model 4x4 truck from Fiat Chrysler

Other
 Total prescriptions (TRx), see Pharmaceutical marketing
 TRX, an identifier for Thioredoxin
 TRX System, suspension training
 Tun Razak Exchange, Kuala Lumpur, Malaysia
 Tron (cryptocurrency)

See also
 TRX1 (disambiguation)